The New Jersey Stallions were an American soccer team, founded in 1996, which competed in various divisions of the United Soccer Leagues until 2004, after which the team left the league and the franchise was terminated.
The club originally started in 1996 as the New York/New Jersey Stallions in the original USISL Select League, before moving to Toms River, New Jersey and becoming the New Jersey Stallions in 1999. They moved to Union Township, Union County, New Jersey in 2000, and then to Wayne, New Jersey in 2003, before demoting themselves to the USL PDL for the 2004 season, their final one in competition.

They played their final home games in the stadium at DePaul Catholic High School in Wayne, New Jersey, 19 miles north of the state’s largest city, Newark. The team's colors were blue, white and black.

Year-by-year

Honors
 USL D-3 Pro League Northern Division Champions 2000

Stadia
 Stadium at DePaul Catholic High School, Wayne, New Jersey 2004

Notable players
 Giuseppe Rossi
 Andrian Gómez
 Juan Lo
 Daniel Campos
 Frantz Jean-Charles
 Matt Miazga
 Marcelo Fracchia

External links
 Official Site

 
Soccer clubs in New Jersey
USL Second Division teams
Defunct Premier Development League teams
1996 establishments in New Jersey
2004 disestablishments in New Jersey
Association football clubs established in 1996
Association football clubs disestablished in 2004